Jonathan Amos is an English film and television editor. He has worked on TV series such as Spooks and Party Animals, New Street Law and feature films Scott Pilgrim vs. the World (2010), 20,000 Days on Earth (2014), Paddington 2 (2017), and Baby Driver (2017), he won the BAFTA Award for Best Editing and was also nominated for an Academy Award for Best Film Editing. He was a co-editor on the 2018 film The Sisters Brothers.

References

External links 
 

Living people
Year of birth missing (living people)
Australian film editors
Best Editing BAFTA Award winners